Cowden Pound Pastures is a  biological Site of Special Scientific Interest north of Cowden in Kent. It is managed by the Kent Wildlife Trust

This is unimproved neutral grassland, which is a nationally rare habitat, and it is grazed to prevent scrub invading the pasture. Grasses include crested dog's tail and common knapweed, and an area of wet grassland by a stream has jointed rush and water mint.

There is access from the drive to Walnut Tree Cottage on Hartfield Road, but the gate is padlocked.

References

Kent Wildlife Trust
Sites of Special Scientific Interest in Kent